Tetragraptus approximatus is a species of dichograptid graptolite belonging to the genus Tetragraptus. It existed during the Floian Age ( million years ago) of the Ordovician. It is an important index fossil in biostratigraphy.

Description
The general outline of each Tetragraptus approximatus colony (rhabdosome) is highly distinctive. The thecae are tilted at a 45° angle to the axis.

Taxonomy
Tetragraptus approximatus is classified under the genus Tetragraptus of the family Dichograptidae. It was first described by the British paleontologist Henry Alleyne Nicholson in 1873 from specimens recovered from Lévis, Quebec, Canada.

Distribution
Tetragraptus approximatus is found worldwide. It has been identified in graptoliferous rocks from Australia, New Zealand, Canada (Newfoundland), the United States (Texas), Kazakhstan, Russia (Taimyr), China, South America, Norway, and Sweden. It is unknown, however, in areas which lack coeval graptoliferous rocks like the United Kingdom, Spitsbergen, and Africa.

Biostratigraphy
Tetragraptus approximatus is used in biostratigraphy as an index fossil. Its first appearance at the GSSP section of the Diabasbrottet Quarry in Västergötland, Sweden is defined as the beginning of the Floian Age ( million years ago) of the Ordovician.

References

Graptolites
Ordovician invertebrates
Animals described in 1873
Index fossils
Ordovician animals of North America
Floian